The Nordkapp class is a Norwegian Coast Guard ship class built in the 1980s, and is used for rescue, fishery inspection, research purposes and general EEZ patrol in Norwegian waters. It is a class of ships purpose-built for the Norwegian Coast Guard with a secondary role as wartime naval escorts. The Norwegian Coast Guard is a part of the Royal Norwegian Navy, and has some police authority.

In June 2018 it was announced that the Vard Group, a subsidiary of Fincantieri, will build three replacement vessels for NOK 5 billion; delivery of the three new vessels is scheduled to be in 1Q 2022, 1Q 2023, and 1Q 2024, respectively.

Design
The Nordkapp class carried one helicopter at launch; the Westland Lynx, but was decommissioned in 2014. The ships are capable of ice browsing. Due to the fact that these vessels may serve as wartime naval escorts they have provisions to carry additional weapons and sensors, such as anti-ship missiles and torpedoes.

Namesake
The Nordkapp-class is named after North Cape, in Norwegian: Nordkapp, which is also the name of one of the vessels of the class.
 
A fisheries protection vessel named  served the Royal Norwegian Navy from 1937 to 1954, including distinguished World War II service.

History
NoCGV Andenes patrolled the Persian Gulf during the Gulf War in 1991 as part of the Coalition forces. In 1994, the ship was involved in an altercation with the Sea Shepherd Conservation Society's ship Whales Forever, leading to a collision and damage to both ships.

The Nordkapp-class vessels are to be replaced from 2022 by the new, and larger, Jan-Mayen class patrol vessels currently under construction.

NoCGV Senja was decommissioned in November 2021.

NoCGV Nordkapp was transferred to the Navy's mine warfare branch in November 2022, and changed her prefix to HNoMS. In 2023 she will operate as the flagship in Standing NATO Mine Countermeasures Group 1.

Ships
The class consists of three vessels:
  (W320) - transferred to the navy as HNoMS Nordkapp (A531) on 1 November 2022. Will serve as the flagship of Standing NATO Mine Countermeasures Group 1 in 2023.
  (W321) - Decommissioned November 2021
  (W322)

References

 
Talk

External links
 Kystvakt - official web pages with facts and pictures (English)

Norwegian Coast Guard
Patrol vessels of the Norwegian Coast Guard
Patrol ship classes